Francis Barrett (2 August 1872 – 22 March 1907) was a Scottish footballer, who played as a goalkeeper. He was born in Dundee.

Barrett played for Dundee Harp before joining Dundee Football Club upon its foundation in 1893. While with the Dark Blues, he would make 49 total appearances for the club in their first three seasons, and would win two caps for Scotland in 1894 and 1895. In September 1896, he signed with Newton Heath (now Manchester United). He made 132 appearances for the club, scoring no goals. In May 1900, he left for New Brighton Tower. In 1901, he briefly returned to Manchester, making eight appearances for Manchester City. In 1903, he became one of the founding players of Aberdeen Football Club. He died in 1907, aged 35. After Barrett's death, Manchester United gifted £35 to his widow.

References

1872 births
1907 deaths
Footballers from Dundee
Scottish footballers
Scotland international footballers
Association football goalkeepers
Dundee Harp F.C. players
Dundee F.C. players
Manchester United F.C. players
New Brighton Tower F.C. players
Arbroath F.C. players
Manchester City F.C. players
Aberdeen F.C. players
Scottish Football League players
English Football League players
Place of death missing